The 1963–64 Irish Cup was the 84th edition of Northern Ireland's premier football knock-out cup competition. It began on 22 February 1964, and concluded on 25 April with the final.

The trophy was won by Derry City, who won the trophy for the third time defeating Glentoran in the final. The defending champions were Linfield, who were defeated 2-0 in the first round by Crusaders.

There was also a qualifying round, which saw four junior teams qualify for the first round: Ballyclare Comrades (1-0 against Brantwood), Banbridge Town (1-0 against Larne), Carrick Rangers (4-3 against Queen's University), and Newry Town (2-1 against Dundela).

Results

First round

|}

Replays

|}

Second replay

|}

Quarter-finals

|}

Replay

|}

Semi-finals

|}

Final

References

Irish Cup seasons
1963–64 in Northern Ireland association football
1963–64 domestic association football cups